Amsterdam is a Canadian comedy-drama film, directed by Stefan Miljevic and released in 2013. The film centres on Jeff (Gabriel Sabourin), Marc (Louis Champagne) and Sam (Robin Aubert), three friends from Quebec who plan a weekend fishing trip that unexpectedly turns into an impromptu flight to Amsterdam, where Sam reveals that his wife Madeleine (Suzanne Clément) is pregnant and he does not want to return home.

The film received two Canadian Screen Award nominations at the 2nd Canadian Screen Awards, for Best Editing (Carina Baccanale) and Best Overall Sound (Arnaud Derimay, Benoît Leduc and Stéphane Bergeron).

References

External links 
 

2013 films
2013 comedy-drama films
Canadian comedy-drama films
Quebec films
French-language Canadian films
2010s Canadian films